Vevčani is a village in North Macedonia. It is the only settlement and seat of Vevčani Municipality.

Geography 

The village of Vevčani is found in the southwestern range at the foot of the Jablanica mountain range. It is situated from 800 – 950 metres above sea level. The village is located 14 km North-West of the town of Struga. The village is situated near the villages of Oktisi, Velešta, Podgorci, Gorna Belica with the Albanian border to the West of the village.

Vevčani Springs 
The famous Vevčani springs are some of the most famous springs to be found in North Macedonia. The springs are located on the eastern slope of the Jablanica mountain range which run through the village of Vevčani at an approximately sea level altitude at over 900 metres. The largest spring is located at the opening of one of the many caves in the region. Below the largest spring are ten minor springs which all converge together. The most famous spring  is "Jankov Kamen" which is situated at 1200 metres above sea level. Another spring is "Mala Livada" from which the water has a unique flavour and colour. It is situated at over 1600 metres above sea level. The highest spring is "Golina" situated at over 2000 metres above sea level. The rate of water flow from the springs is estimated to exceed the rate of 1500 litres per second, most notably in Spring.

Vevčani Lakes
Within the vicinity of the village of Vevčani there are many glacial lakes. The highest and most prominent glacial lake is "Lokva" which is situated at over 2000 metres above sea level on Mount Jablanica. It is the main provider of water to the "Golina" spring.

Etymology
The word "Vevčani" is based on an Old Church Slavonic word. The word Ves which meant village in Old Church Slavonic. The word Vesčani meant in Old Church Slavonic, "people of Ves" or "Vesians". This soon became the name of the settlement. By the 14th century, the name "Veščani" was being used. In the 17th century records, the village is referred to Veščano (Вешчано). By the early 20th century, the village was often referred to as Vehčani (Вехчани) or Vesčani (Весчани), until the name Vevčani was officially adopted. The village is also known as Veçani in Albanian and Vevčani in both Serbian and Bulgarian.

History

Early history
It was believed that the village of Vevčani had been founded sometime during period from the end of the sixth century to the beginning of the eighth century. The village was founded most probably by Berziti, who had adopted Christianity. The first settlement was originally at the foot of the Jablanica mountain. It was believed to have been founded in a place known as Selište (Old Church Slavonic: Сєлиштє). However, the newest archaeological researches show that the village was there at least in second century B.C. It can not be excluded that somewhere in sixth century newly settled village Seliste merged with the long existing village. The crucial fact is that right above the village, the remains of a Roman camp have been found, and history states that Romans usually camped near villages to be able to get supplies.

Ottoman Empire
After the Battle of Kosovo in 1389, the area was under Ottoman rule for many centuries.

After the Balkan Wars
After the Balkans Wars, the village of Vevčani joined the Kingdom of Serbia. It was a part of the Vardar Banovina during the Kingdom of Yugoslavia. The name of the village was officially changed to Veçani.

Under Communist rule
In 1945, the village of Vevčani became a part of the newly founded People's Republic of Macedonia. In 1945 the municipality of Vevčani was founded which included the nearby villages of Oktisi and Gorna Belica. This was dissolved in 1952 as Vevčani became a part of the Velešta municipality until 1956. In 1956 it was merged with the Struga Municipality.

Vevčani Emergency
The Vevčani Emergency was an incident which occurred in the village on 26 May and 7 August 1987. The residents of Vevčani defied the decision of the Yugoslavian government to redirect water from the springs to Struga. They were at odds with the government's attempts to have the inhabitants of Struga using what they saw as their water. Police were assembled twice in the village before the situation was resolved. The residents had sparked calls for democracy and freedom from the Yugoslavia government. A "Republic of Vevčani" had been planned by the residents.

Republic of Vevčani and the Vevčani Ličnik

After the fall of Communism, as a bid to attract more tourism to the village, the residents of Vevčani voted to create an independent republic. The "Republic of Vevčani" was soon founded.

As a part of the self-styled "Independent Republic of Vevčani" declared in 2002, the "Vevčani Ličnik" was created as souvenir currency for the area. The "Ličnici" (plural) come in denominations of 1, 2, 5, 10, 50, 100, 500 and 1,000. The author was artist Simun Lesoski.

Municipality of Vevčani
In 2002, the Vevčani municipality was founded. The reconstituted municipality included only the village of Vevčani.

Culture
Vevčani is known for being a hub of culture and history in the Drimkol region. It has old architecture and many preserved churches from the 17th and 18th centuries.

Green Agenda
The process of creating the GA document in Macedonia began in August 2007, with the election of the municipality of Vevčani as one of the three pilot municipalities in Macedonia where the GA will be implemented.

The process of creating the GA of Vevčani is very broad, based on the work of the wide community  and involves citizens that participate in the creating of the document and by doing that they influence on the decision-making process in the community.

For the first time in Macedonia, the citizens have the opportunity directly to influence the process of decision making, to create partner relations with the local government and business sector in order to achieve benefits for the community.

Religion
Vevčani is home to the Parish of Vevčani which also includes the villages of Oktisi and Gorna Belica. For centuries the village has been a Christian village surrounded by many Muslim villages. The village is home to 19 Churches, Monasteries and Chapels. The central church of the village however is Sveti Nikola which dates back from 1876. A prominent monastery is Sveti Spas which is situated at over 1,300 metres above sea level.

Cultural heritage
The village has 11 cultural heritage sites (Spomenici na kulturata) including:
 House of Duckinoski family 
 House of Korunoski family 
 House of Kostojčinoski family 
 House of Ḱitanoski family 
 House of Pešinoski family
 House of Pluškoski family
 House of Kalajdžieski family
 House of Gogoski family
 House of Daskaloski family
 House of Poposki family
 Kostojčinoski fulling mill and gristmill - a cultural heritage site

Vevčani-Radožda dialect

The inhabitants of Vevčani speak a unique dialect of Macedonian which is known as the Vevčani-Radožda dialect. The dialect is traditionally spoken in three other villages along with Vevčani. They are Radožda and Mali Vlaj along with the village of Lin in Albania.

The Carnival of Vevčani
The Carnival of Vevčani is an annual event claimed to be over 1,400 years old. It is held to celebrate the New Year according to the Julian calendar. During the carnival attendees wear masks, usually dressing in traditional and modern costumes. They also employ social and political satire. 

In 1993, Vevčani became a member of the World Federation of Carnival Cities.

Demographics

Demographic history
In a 1509 defter, the village was part of the Ohrid vilayet, and had 208 households. In 1519, the village had 223 households. In 1634, it was registered under the name Vevčano with a total of 134 households. The French ethnographic study of Macedonia conducted in 1878, Ethnography of the vilayets of Adrianople, of Monastir and of Salonica,, counted the village as having 865 houses and 2430 inhabitants, which at the time were considered Bulgarians. Vasil Kanchov's study of Macedonia in 1900, Macedonia, Ethnography and Statistics,, counted the village as having 2590 Bulgarian inhabitants. A study conducted in 1907 had counted 440 households with 2,347 inhabitants. In 1910, a Serbian commune of the Ecumenical Patriarchate of Constantinople numbered 17 households which were considered ethnically Serbian in the village. Some Aromanians from the nearby village of Gorna Belica have resettled in Vevčani. The 1994 census counted 2,448 inhabitants as residing in the village.

Demographics today
According to the 2002 Macedonian census, the population of Vevčani was 2,433. In 2002, there were 593 households present in Vevčani. Of the 2,433 inhabitants, 1,229 were Males while 1,204 were females. The ethnic composition was as follows:

 Macedonians - 2,422 (99.55%)
 Serbs - 3 (0.12%)
 Aromanians - 1 (0.04%)
 Others - 7 (0.28%)

Sport
The football team "FK Vevčani" is based in Vevčani. The team is a competitor in the Macedonian Treta Liga.

Notable people 
 Jovan Popovski - writer, journalist
 Dimce Partaloski - lawyer, author of the Vevčani Dictionary (1998, 2009)
 Milutin Bebekoski - writer
 Jakim Alulov, (? - 1903) - revolutionary and voivode
 Stavre Gogov, (1884 - 1907) - voivode from Vevčani
 Pero Ilieski - mayor of Vevčani
 Simun Lesoski - artist
 Stojan Razmovski - artist

References

External links 
 Official website of the Municipality of Vevčani 
 Website of the KUD Drimkol which is based in Vevčani 
 Municipality of Vevčani 
 Vevčani souvenir banknotes 
 Website of VILLA ALULA - Private villa in Vevčani 

Vevčani